Johfrim Art and Design Studio is a contemporary African art gallery in Nigeria and Scotland. The gallery houses 6,000 diverse artworks from African artists such as Nike Davies-Okundaye, and it holds the third largest art collection in Nigeria.

Gallery history 

Johfrim started as a private art collection and was founded in 2013 by Chief Josephine Oboh Macleod, the first black female to own a contemporary African art and cultural centre in Scotland.

Johfrim houses some African and international artworks and the gallery holds the third largest African art collection in Nigeria, with 6,000 artworks excluding sculptures, paintings and other media. It is located behind Oyasaf and Nike Art Gallery with 7,000 and 8,000 artworks respectively. Johfrim hosts cross-cultural events and represents work by about 50 artists such as Lamidi Olonade Fakeye,  approximately 70% of whom are from Africa. Johfrim is an affiliation of the JOM charity.

Notable works

 African Queen, painting sold by Nelson Mandela Foundation
 The Maiden, sculpture displayed by Nike Art Gallery

References

External links
 

African art museums
Art collections in Nigeria
Art museum collections
Art museums and galleries in Lagos
Art museums and galleries in Scotland
Arts centres in Scotland
Contemporary art galleries in Africa
Contemporary art galleries in Scotland
Cultural promotion organizations
Cultural venues in Lagos
Culture by city in Scotland
Culture in Glasgow
Nigerian art
Private collections in Nigeria
Scottish art collectors
Scottish art dealers